Ahmed Abdul-Malik (born Jonathan Tim, Jr.; January 30, 1927 – October 2, 1993) was an American jazz double bassist and oud player.

Abdul-Malik is remembered for integrating Middle Eastern and North African music styles in his jazz music. He was a bass player for Art Blakey, Earl Hines, Randy Weston, and Thelonious Monk, among others.

Early life
Abdul-Malik claimed that his father was from Sudan and moved to the United States. Research by historian Robin Kelley, however, indicates that Abdul-Malik was born to Caribbean immigrants and changed his birth name: Ahmed Abdul-Malik was born Jonathan Tim Jr., (sometimes spelled "Timm") on January 30, 1927, to Matilda and Jonathan Tim Sr. – both of whom had immigrated from St. Vincent in the British West Indies three years earlier. They also had a daughter, Caroline, born a little more than a year after Jonathan Jr. Jonathan Tim Sr.'s death certificate not only confirms his birth in St. Vincent, it indicates that his father – Abdul-Malik's grandfather – James Tim, and his mother, Mary Daniels, were both from the Caribbean. City directories for Brooklyn, as well as the American Federation of Musicians Union Local 802 directory, confirm the bassist's birth name as Jonathan Tim Jr.

The family lived at 545 Hopkinson Avenue, but moved to 1984 Atlantic Avenue before their son began school. Jonathan, Jr. had violin lessons from his father, who was a plasterer and general laborer. Aged seven, Jonathan, Jr. attended the Vardi School of Music and Art, "to continue his violin training, and over time took up piano, cello, bass, and tuba." His parents divorced in the late 1930s, and he lived with his father and new wife, at 2117 Dean Street, but his father died on February 9, 1941, from a bleeding gastric ulcer. Jonathan, Jr. continued studying, including having lessons with local bassist Franklin Skeete, before joining The High School of Music & Art in Harlem. There, "his skills on violin and viola earned him a spot in the All-City Orchestra."

Later life
Abdul-Malik was most active as a jazz musician from the mid-1950s to the mid-1960s. He recorded half a dozen albums as leader, which have been described as containing a "refreshing" fusion of jazz with Arabic and African music. During this time he was also described as "a hard bop bassist of some distinction". As an oud player he did a tour of South America for the United States Department of State and performed at an African jazz festival in Morocco.

Discography

As leader 
 1958: Jazz Sahara (Riverside) with Johnny Griffin
 1959: East Meets West (RCA Victor)
 1961: The Music of Ahmed Abdul-Malik (New Jazz)
 1962: Sounds of Africa (New Jazz) 
 1963: The Eastern Moods of Ahmed Abdul-Malik (Prestige)
 1964: Spellbound (Status) with Ray Nance and Seldon Powell

As sideman 
With Art Blakey
The African Beat (Blue Note, 1962)

With John Coltrane
Live! at the Village Vanguard (Impulse!, 1961)

With Walt Dickerson
Relativity (New Jazz, 1962)
Jazz Impressions of Lawrence of Arabia (Dauntless, 1963)

With Earl Hines
 'Fatha': The New Earl Hines Trio (1964)
The Real Earl Hines (1964)

With Jutta Hipp
Jutta Hipp with Zoot Sims (1956)

With Odetta
Sometimes I Feel Like Cryin' (RCA Victor, 1962)
Odetta and the Blues (Riverside, 1962)
Odetta Sings the Blues (Riverside, 1968)

With Herbie Mann
Herbie Mann at the Village Gate (Atlantic, 1961)
Herbie Mann Returns to the Village Gate (Atlantic, 1961 [1963])

With Ken McIntyre
 Year of the Iron Sheep (United Artists, 1962)

With Thelonious Monk
Misterioso (Riverside, 1958)
Thelonious in Action (Riverside, 1958)
Discovery! Live at Five Spot (Blue Note, 1958)
Thelonious Monk Quartet with John Coltrane at Carnegie Hall (Blue Note, 1957, released 2005)

With Dave Pike
Limbo Carnival (New Jazz, 1962)

With Randy Weston
With These Hands... (Riverside, 1956)
Jazz à la Bohemia (Riverside, 1956)
The Modern Art of Jazz by Randy Weston (Dawn, 1956)
Tanjah (Polydor, 1973)

References 

1927 births
1993 deaths
African-American guitarists
American jazz bass guitarists
American oud players
Musicians from Brooklyn
Riverside Records artists
African-American Muslims
American Muslims
American Ahmadis
20th-century American bass guitarists
American people of Saint Vincent and the Grenadines descent
Guitarists from New York (state)
American male bass guitarists
The High School of Music & Art alumni
Jazz musicians from New York (state)
20th-century American male musicians
American male jazz musicians
People from Brownsville, Brooklyn
People from Crown Heights, Brooklyn
20th-century African-American musicians